The Mākaha Sons of Niʻihau or The Mākaha Sons are a Hawaiian musical group formed in 1976 on the island of Oahu by Jerome Koko, Louis "Moon" Kauakahi, Skippy Kamakawiwoʻole, Israel Kamakawiwoʻole, and Sam Gray. The band started its career as an opening act at a small nightclub called Uptown Yokos. The group has changed members several times; Skippy Kamakawiwoʻole died of weight-related health problems in 1982. The name was changed to the Mahaka Sons after Israel Kamakawiwoʻole abruptly quit the group in 1993. 

The Mākaha Sons of Niʻihau and the Makaha Sons have released 21 CDs, and produced a DVD on their own record label. They have won Nā Hōkū Hanohano Awards and Hawaii Music Awards. They produced their own signature concert, "Take a Walk in the Country," in Hawaii for many years. They produce and promote young artists in traditional Hawaiian music.

In commemoration of the group’s 30th anniversary, the Sons reflect back to the times and places they have had the privilege and honor to have been a part of. Their performances have taken them to such prestigious places as Carnegie Hall in New York City, Washington, D. C., and in Hawaii, with performances for both the President and Vice President of the United States. They have also appeared on the movie, North Shore and have been featured guests on shows as The Captain and Tennille Show and NBC's Today Show with Bryant Gumbel and Katie Couric. Locally they have appeared on shows such as Island Music, Island Heart and Emme’s Island Moments, and have accompanied American musician Kenny Loggins for his CD release party at Ala Moana Center. The Makaha Sons formed the Makaha Sons Foundation in 2004, which supports variety of organizations, funding some of Hawaii’s police officers, funding families afflicted with illnesses, and providing scholarships each year to a selected high school senior.

Albums 
No Kristo (1976)
Kahea O Keale (1977)
Keala (1978)
Live at Hanks Place (1978)
Mahalo, Ke Akua (1981)
Puana Hou Me Ke Aloha (1984)
Hoʻola (1986)	
Hoʻoluana (1991)
Ke Alaula (1994)
Kuikawa (1996)

External links
Official Mākaha Sons website

Musical groups from Hawaii
Musical groups established in 1976
1976 establishments in Hawaii
Mountain Apple Company artists
Na Hoku Hanohano Award winners